Best of Friends was a British children's game show that ran from 7 March 2004 to 13 August 2008. It first aired on CBBC for series 1, then on BBC One from series 2-3 and then back on CBBC from series 4–5.

Format

Tasks and Treats
In the show, five friends with a strong friendship must complete a series of three unpleasant tasks in order to win a final treat. The tasks include mucking out pigs, cleaning bins, picking up ice with the bare feet, getting your feet tickled without laughing or smiling and so on, for the test of friendship. While some members of the group are doing the task, their friends do treats such as visiting animals at the RSPCA, getting a manicure, shopping, going to a football game, going to a theme park etc. They must make decisions deciding on who will do the task and who will do the treat or they can use the "Unlucky Dip".

"The Unlucky Dip"
The unlucky dip contains three, two or one blue sweet(s) in a bag. The friends choose a sweet each (without looking) from the bag, and then suck it. The number of children to do the next task, and therefore the number of blue sweets in the bag, will depend on the success of the previous task. The people or person with the blue sweet(s) will have a blue tongue and will be forced to do the task, while the others will do the treat. The first task requires three people and, each time the children pass a task, the number needed to do the next task will reduce. For the final task they have three options: the unlucky dip, volunteer or the whole team can do the task as it is the hardest.

The presenters also have an option of volunteering to do the task. If they do not volunteer, the presenters also do a compulsory Unlucky Dip with each task. The presenter with a blue tongue will be forced to do the task.

Transmissions

Original series

Africa

Specials

Episodes

Series 1 (2004)

Series 2 (2005)

Series 3 (2007)

Series 4 (2008)

Series 5 (2008)

Africa (2005)

References

External links

2004 British television series debuts
2008 British television series endings
2000s British children's television series
2000s British game shows
BBC children's television shows
British children's game shows
English-language television shows